Leviviricetes is a class of viruses, which infect prokaryotes. Most of these bacteriophages were discovered by metagenomics.

Taxonomy
Leviviricetes contains two orders and nine genera unassigned to an order. This is shown hereafter:

Orders:

 Norzivirales
 Timlovirales

Unassigned genera:

 Chimpavirus
 Hohglivirus
 Mahrahvirus
 Meihzavirus
 Nicedsevirus
 Sculuvirus
 Skrubnovirus
 Tetipavirus
 Winunavirus

References

Virus classes